Sommaruga is a surname. Notable people with the surname include:

 Cornelio Sommaruga (born 1932), Swiss humanitarian, lawyer, and diplomat
 Giuseppe Sommaruga (1867–1917), Italian architect of the Art nouveau movement
 Simonetta Sommaruga (born 1960), Swiss politician, distant relative of Cornelio